T'o or To (majuscule: Թ; minuscule: թ; Armenian: թո; Classical Armenian: թօ) is the ninth letter of the Armenian alphabet. It has a numerical value of 9. It is created by Mesrop Mashtots in the 5th century AD. It represents the aspirated voiceless alveolar plosive on both Eastern and Western Armenian. 

Its shape is similar to P; however this is not related.

Computing codes

Braille

Related characters and other similar characters
 T t : Latin letter T
 Th th : Latin digraph Th
 Ꚋ ꚋ : Cyrillic letter Te with middle hook
 Ҭ ҭ : Cyrillic letter Te with descender
 Ⴒ ⴒ ტ : Georgian letter T'ari

References

External links
 Թ on Wiktionary
 թ on Wiktionary

Armenian letters